Bruni can refer to:

 Bruni (surname)
 Bruni, Texas
 Bruni (horse), an Irish-bred Thoroughbred racehorse
 Bruni Olympic .380 BBM blank firing revolver
 a character from Frozen II

See also
 Brunei
 Bruno (disambiguation)